Jan Marcin Szancer (12 November 1902 – 21 March 1973) was a Polish illustrator, scenographer and professor at the Academy of Fine Arts in Warsaw.

Szancer was born into a Jewish family in Kraków. He studied at the Kraków Academy of Fine Arts, and later in France and Italy.

He was a friend of Jan Brzechwa many of whose poems he illustrated.

Szancer illustrated over 200 books, including Henryk Sienkiewicz's Trilogy, Adam Mickiewicz's Pan Tadeusz and Brzechwa's Pan Kleks series. Beginning in May 1945, he was the editor and cover-illustrator of the children's magazine Świerszczyk. He was the first (post World War II) artistic director for Telewizja Polska, the Polish broadcasting organization.

The "Crooked House of Sopot" (Polish: Krzywy Domek) is based on one of his drawings.

References

External links
  Jan Marcin Szancer at the Culture.pl 
 Jan Marcin Szancer at the Encyklopedia WIEM 

1902 births
1973 deaths
20th-century Polish Jews
Polish illustrators
Jan Matejko Academy of Fine Arts alumni
Recipients of the State Award Badge (Poland)
Academic staff of the Academy of Fine Arts in Warsaw